The Hare and Hounds is a public house at 104 Sopwell Lane in St Albans, Hertfordshire, England.  The timber framed building has a plastered exterior. It is listed Grade II with Historic England and is dated "seventeenth century or earlier".

References

Pubs in St Albans
Grade II listed pubs in Hertfordshire
Timber framed buildings in Hertfordshire